The 2002 AFC U-19 Women's Championship was the first instance of the AFC U-19 Women's Championship. It was held from 19 to 28 April 2002 in Goa, India. Two finalists are qualified 2002 FIFA U-19 Women's World Championship.

Group stage

Group A

Group B

Group C

Ranking of second-placed teams

Knockout stage

Semi-finals
Winners qualify for 2002 FIFA U-19 Women's World Championship.

Third place match

Final

Winners

External links 
 AFC U-19 Women's Championship GOA, India 2002
 Asian Women U-19 Championship 2002

AFC U-19 Women's Championship
Wom
AFc
2002
2001–02 in Indian football
2002 in youth association football
2002 in Indian women's sport
Sport in Goa